Michael P. Jensen, born 1970, is an Australian clergyman, author, and lecturer. He has served as the rector in the Anglican parish of St Mark's Church, Darling Point since 2013; and was formerly a professor of theology at Moore College, Sydney. He is a son of the former archbishop of Sydney, The Most Reverend Peter Jensen.

On 6 May 2015 Jensen's book You: An Introduction (2008) was banned from state schools by the New South Wales Department of Education and Communities on the basis of a "potential risk to students in the delivery of this material, if not taught sensitively and in an age appropriate manner." The ban was lifted 18 May 2015.

In September 2018, Jensen launched a podcast, With All Due Respect, which he co-hosts with Megan Powell du Toit, a Baptist minister. The podcast is the first for Eternity News, an Australian Christian news site. The podcast has given rise to a wider project about conversation across difference, The WADR Project. The podcast moved to the Undeceptions Network in 2022.

Books
 You: An Introduction (Matthias Media, 2008)
 Martyrdom and Identity: The Self on Trial (T&T Clark, 2010)
 My God, My God - Is it Possible to Believe Anymore? (Cascade, 2012)
 Sydney Anglicanism: An Apology (Wipf & Stock, 2012)
 True Feelings: Perspectives on emotions in Christian life and ministry (Inter-Varsity Press, 2012)
 Is Forgiveness Really Free? (The Good Book Co, 2013)
 Pieces of Eternity (Acorn, 2013)
 "A T&T Clark Reader in Theological Anthropology" (Bloomsbury, 2017)
 Theological Anthropology and the Great Literary Genres (Fortress, 2019)
 Between Tick and Tock: What the Bible Says About How It All Begins, How It All Ends and Everything in Between (Morning Star, 2020)
 Reformation Anglican Worship: Experiencing Grace, Expressing Gratitude (Crossway, 2021)

References

Living people
Year of birth missing (living people)
Australian Anglican priests
Australian Christian theologians
Moore Theological College alumni
Academic staff of Moore Theological College